| tries = {{#expr:
 + 2 + 4 + 8 + 4 + 6 + 6
 + 3 + 10 + 10 + 9 + 8 + 4
 + 6 + 7 + 9 + 8 + 4 + 8
 + 5 + 5 + 2 + 4 + 11 + 7
 + 6 + 11 + 5 + 5 + 11 + 4
 + 7 + 5 + 4 + 7 + 3 + 8
 + 6 + 3 + 4 + 7 + 5 + 7
 + 2 + 3 + 2 + 4 + 8 + 6
 + 9 + 5 + 7 + 3 + 2 + 2
 + 2 + 6 + 5 + 3 + 3 + 3
 + 8 + 6 + 5 + 3 + 7 + 4
 + 4 + 3 + 7 + 2 + 5 + 4
 + 5 + 7 + 11 + 5 + 12 + 5
 + 6 + 9 + 5 + 8 + 5 + 3
 + 5 + 8 + 3 + 5 + 7 + 2
 + 0 + 7 + 3 + 8 + 9 + 5
 + 5 + 6 + 4 + 5 + 3 + 5
 + 3 + 5 + 4 + 5 + 9 + 11
 + 6 + 6 + 3 + 7 + 5 + 7
 + 6 + 0 + 5 + 4 + 5 + 5
 + 2 + 3 + 7 + 6 + 6 + 5
 + 9 + 7 + 5 + 13 + 6 + 6
 + 9 + 7
 + 10
}}
| top point scorer = George Ford (Leicester)(221 points)
| top try scorer = Cobus Reinach (Northampton),Denny Solomona (Sale)(12 tries)
| website    = www.premiershiprugby.com
| prevseason = 2017–18
| nextseason = 2019–20
}}

The 2018–19 Gallagher Premiership was the 32nd season of the top flight English domestic rugby union competition and the first one to be sponsored by Gallagher. The reigning champions entering the season were Saracens, who had claimed their fourth title after defeating Exeter Chiefs in the 2018 final. Bristol Bears had been promoted as champions from the 2017–18 RFU Championship at the first attempt.

The competition was broadcast by BT Sport for the sixth successive season and with five games also simulcast free-to-air on Channel 5. Highlights of each weekend's games were shown on Channel 5 with extended highlights on BT Sport.

Summary
Saracens won their fifth title after defeating Exeter Chiefs in the final at Twickenham after having finished second in the regular season table. Newcastle Falcons were relegated after being unable to win their penultimate game of the season. It was the third time that Newcastle have been relegated from the top flight since the leagues began and the first time since the 2011–12 Premiership Rugby season.

For the first time since 2004, there was no London Double Header at Twickenham due to redevelopment work causing the closure of the stadium.

Teams
Twelve teams compete in the league – the top eleven teams from the previous season and Bristol Bears who were promoted from the 2017–18 RFU Championship after a top flight absence of one year. They replaced London Irish who were relegated after one year in the top flight.

Stadiums and locations

Preseason
The 2018 edition of the Premiership Rugby Sevens Series would be held on 27 and 28 July at Franklin's Gardens. All twelve Premiership teams would feature in one venue over two days. Teams would be split into four pools of three which played each other once in a round-robin basis with the tournament splitting into Cup and Plate competitions on the second day.

Table

Fixtures
Fixtures for the season were announced by Premiership Rugby on 6 July 2018. Due to redevelopment work causing the closure of Twickenham Stadium, round 1 did not include the London Double Header.

Despite a four-year deal being struck in 2016, no matches took place in the United States. It had previously been reported that Sale Sharks vs Harlequins in round 18 would take place at Toyota Park just outside Chicago, Illinois. However, the round 6 match between Harlequins and Saracens was broadcast live in the US on a major network with NBC as opposed to NBCSN broadcasting for the first time.

All fixtures are subject to change.

Highlights of the season include:
 The Derby — Northampton Saints vs Leicester Tigers at Twickenham on 6 October
 Big Game 11 — Harlequins will host Wasps in this season's edition of the Big Game at Twickenham on 29 December.
Derby Day Saracens vs Harlequins at London Stadium on 23 March.
The Big One Newcastle Falcons vs Sale Sharks at St James' Park on 23 March
 The Clash — Bath Rugby will return to Twickenham on 6 April. This year's opponent will be fellow West Country rivals Bristol Bears.

Regular season

Round 1

Round 2

Round 3

Round 4

Round 5

Round 6

Round 7

Round 8

Round 9

Round 10

Round 11

Round 12

Round 13

Round 14

Round 15

Round 16

Round 17

Round 18

Round 19

Round 20

Round 21

Newcastle Falcons are relegated.

Round 22

Play-offs
As in previous seasons, the top four teams in the Premiership table, following the conclusion of the regular season, contest the play-off semi-finals in a 1st vs 4th and 2nd vs 3rd format, with the higher ranking team having home advantage. The two winners of the semi-finals then meet in the Premiership Final at Twickenham on 1 June 2019.

Bracket

Semi-finals

Final

Leading scorers
Note: Flags indicate national union as has been defined under WR eligibility rules. Players may hold more than one non-WR nationality.

Most points

Source:

Most tries

Source:

Season attendances

By club

Highest attendances

Notes

References

External links
 

 
2018-19
 
England